Éanna Hardwicke is an Irish actor and filmmaker. He began his career as a child actor in Conor McPherson's The Eclipse (2009). He was named a Screen International Star of Tomorrow in the publication's inaugural Irish edition.

Early life and education
Hardwicke is originally from the St Luke's–Military Hill area of Cork before his family moved out to Glanmire. He attended Cork School Project (now Cork Educate Together Secondary School) and then Ashton School. He began acting at the age of ten, participating in youth theatre at the Gaiety School of Acting's Cork campus, National Association of Youth Drama (NAYD), and Cork School of Music. He went on to graduate with a Bachelor of Arts in Acting from The Lir Academy in 2018.

Career
Hardwicke began his career as a child actor in Conor McPherson's 2009 horror film The Eclipse. He returned to the screen ten years later in 2019, appearing in the science fiction film Vivarium and making his television debut in an episode of the Syfy series Krypton. He also appeared in The Misfit Mythology at the Cork Arts Theatre and participated in a RISE Productions podcast in which he, Gavin Kostick, Danielle Galligan, and Janet Moran performed Kostick's modern version of Homer's Odyssey.

In 2020, Hardwicke played Rob Hegarty, Connell's (Paul Mescal) school friend, in the BBC Three and Hulu adaptation of Sally Rooney's Normal People. He then had a recurring role in the RTÉ crime drama Smother. In 2022, Hardwicke joined the cast of the Netflix series Fate: The Winx Saga for its second season and starred in the sports drama film Lakelands, the later of which earned him and Danielle Galligan the Galway Film Fleadh's Bingham Ray New Talent Award. He also appeared in The Sparrow and played a younger version of Stanley Townsend's character in the film About Joan.

Hardwicke has upcoming roles in the BBC One series The Sixth Commandment and the Paramount+ adaptation of Elizabeth Macneal's The Doll Factory.

Filmography

Film

Television

Stage

Audio
 The Odyssey: A New Version (2019), Irish Theatre Podcast

Awards and nominations

Notes

References

External links

Living people
21st-century Irish male actors
Actors from County Cork